Harrami is a rural locality in the North Burnett Region, Queensland, Australia.

Geography 
The locality is bounded to the north by the Dawes Range. The land use is almost entirely grazing on native vegetation.

The locality contains the following mountains:

 Mount Hindmarsh 
 Mount Shaw 
Rawbelle River rises in the north-east of the locality and exits to the south (Rawbelle), where it becomes a tributary of the Nogo River, part of the Burnett River basin which ultimately flows into the Coral Sea.

History 
Harrami Provisional School opened on 7 July 1941 but it closed in 1945. It opened again on 15 September 1947 and in 1948 became Harrami State School. It closed permanently on 20 March 1966. It was at 1546 Harrami Road.

The Harrami hall of the Queensland Country Women's Association was officially opened on Sunday 30 March 1952.  It was on the eastern side of Harrami Road (approx ).

Education 
There are no schools in Harrami. The nearest government primary school is Thangool State School in neighbouring Thangool to the north-west. The nearest government secondary schools are Biloela State High School in Biloela to the north and Monto State High School in Monto to the east.

References

Further reading 

 

North Burnett Region
Localities in Queensland